Emil Iliev (born 31 March 1997) is a Bulgarian footballer who plays as a midfielder.

Career
Emil made his first team league début in a 1–2 home defeat against Lokomotiv Plovdiv on 26 May 2015, coming on as substitute for Daniel Georgiev.

In February 2016, Emil was loaned to Kaliakra Kavarna for the rest of the season.

On 17 January 2018, Iliev returned his hometown to play for Spartak Varna.

Career statistics

References

External links

1997 births
Living people
Bulgarian footballers
Association football midfielders
PFC Cherno More Varna players
PFC Kaliakra Kavarna players
PFC Spartak Varna players
First Professional Football League (Bulgaria) players